Aurivillius is a genus of moths in the family Saturniidae first described by Packard in 1902.

Species
Aurivillius aratus (Westwood, 1849)
Aurivillius cadioui Bouyer, 2008
Aurivillius drumonti Bouyer, 2008
Aurivillius horsini Bouvier, 1927
Aurivillius jolyanorum Bouyer, 1999
Aurivillius oberthuri Bouvier, 1927
Aurivillius seydeli Rougeot, 1966
Aurivillius triramis Rothschild, 1907

References

Saturniinae
Moth genera